Marianne Kriel (born August 30, 1971 in Bellville, Western Cape) is a former backstroke and freestyle swimmer from South Africa, who won the bronze medal in the 100 m backstroke at the 1996 Summer Olympics in Atlanta, Georgia. Met with Nelson Mandela.

She spent some time training at Southern Methodist University (SMU) where she met close friends Tia Gibson and her daughters Meg and Katie.

Kriel also participated in the 1992 Summer Olympics in Barcelona, Spain, and received the President's Award in 1993 and 1996. Kriel was the first woman to captain a multi-code team to the 1994 Commonwealth Games and the 1995 All-Africa Games.

Kriel grew up in Bellville (near Cape Town) where she attended Bellville High School. She continued to be a role model to her fellow pupils of all races and backgrounds, in a way playing a big role in the unification of South Africa's youth.

See also
 List of Olympic medalists in swimming (women)

External links
 

1971 births
Living people
People from Bellville, South Africa
South African female freestyle swimmers
South African female backstroke swimmers
Olympic swimmers of South Africa
Swimmers at the 1992 Summer Olympics
Swimmers at the 1996 Summer Olympics
Olympic bronze medalists for South Africa
Olympic bronze medalists in swimming
Swimmers at the 1994 Commonwealth Games
Commonwealth Games competitors for South Africa
Medalists at the 1996 Summer Olympics
Sportspeople from the Western Cape
African Games medalists in swimming
Competitors at the 1995 All-Africa Games
African Games gold medalists for South Africa
African Games silver medalists for South Africa